Gareth Ellis (born 3 May 1981) is an English former professional rugby league footballer who played as a  and  in the Super League and the NRL, and England and Great Britain at international level.

He played at club level for the Wakefield Trinity Wildcats, Leeds Rhinos (with whom he won Super League XII's 2007 Super League Grand Final and Super League XIII's 2008 Super League Grand Final), and Hull F.C. in the Super League, and for the Wests Tigers in the NRL. He also represented Yorkshire.

Background
Ellis was born in Castleford, West Yorkshire, England.

Playing career

Early career
Ellis was a junior at Castleford Lock Lane prior to signing for Wakefield Trinity Wildcats' Academy side in 1999.

Wakefield Trinity Wildcats
Ellis made his first team début in 1999, he broke into the Wakefield Trinity Wildcats team in 2000, and he made over 100 appearances for the Wakefield Trinity Wildcats.

Leeds
Gareth Ellis was transferred from the Wakefield Trinity Wildcats to the Leeds Rhinos in 2005. As Super League IX champions, Leeds Rhinos faced 2004 NRL season premiers, Canterbury-Bankstown in the 2005 World Club Challenge. Ellis also received a 2006 Super League Grand final runners up medal.

In February 2008, Ellis agreed to a contract with Australian National Rugby League club, Wests Tigers, for a three-year deal commencing in 2009.

Ellis was named in the Super League Dream Team for 2008's Super League XIII season. He played in the 2008 Super League Grand Final victory over St Helens.

Wests Tigers

Great Britain forward Gareth Ellis cited a lifestyle change and the desire to test himself on the biggest stage for his reasons to quit Super League champions Leeds at the end of the new season. Wests Tigers coach Tim Sheens praised new signing Gareth Ellis on making a decision based purely on a challenge rather than money.

He joined the list of British players who have played for the Wests Tigers joint venture through Balmain Tigers and Western Suburbs Magpies – Andy Currier, Ellery Hanley, Lee Crooks, Garry Schofield and Harvey Howard.

Gareth Ellis became the first Great Britain forward to switch to the NRL since former Sydney Roosters hitman Adrian Morley spent six successful seasons in Australia.

Ellis made his NRL début against the Canberra Raiders in round 1 of 2009, and played in 22 games for the season. After not scoring in 2009, he managed 6 tries in 2010. He produced his first off a toe poke from Robbie Farah in round 1, and scored a double against Penrith in round 23 as the team amassed 43 points.

During his second season with the Wests Tigers, Ellis signed an extension until the end of 2013. Coach Tim Sheens said, "In my time here, dollar-for-dollar, he's been the best buy this club has had."

Reduced to 18 appearances in 2011, Ellis made a trip to Britain mid-season, suffering from an ankle injury and home-sickness. However, he played well enough to be named the Wests Tigers Player of the Year for the third consecutive year.

Hull F.C.
It was announced on 28 February 2012 that Ellis was looking to return to Super League in 2013 which has sparked a flurry of interest from Super League clubs to sign the player.
On 21 March 2012 it was announced he would be joining Super League club Hull FC.

Ellis Captained Hull F.C. to victory at Wembley in the Challenge Cup in two successive seasons 2016 & 2017.

However, Ellis returned to the Hull F.C. playing squad after being retired from the sport for 18 months, helping them end a 13 game losing run.
Ellis retired for the 2nd and final time at the end of the 2020 Super League XXV season

Representative career

Yorkshire
Gareth Ellis won cap(s) for Yorkshire while at Wakefield Trinity Wildcats.

Great Britain
Ellis became Wakefields first player to represent Great Britain for 12 years in 2003. Ellis first played for the Great Britain team in the final test of the 2003 Ashes series.

He has been capped 17 times for Great Britain and in 2007 was named in the International Team of the Year having started in 11 consecutive Tests for the Lions.

England
Ellis was selected for the England squad to compete in the 2008 Rugby League World Cup tournament in Australia.

He was selected to play for England against France in the one-off test in 2010.

Accolades and awards
In November 2008, Ellis was named at second-row in the inaugural Rugby League International Federation's (RLIF) Team of the Year, tying for the position with Anthony Laffranchi. In 2009 he was placed in the side again.

Ellis was named the Wests Tigers Player of the Year for 2009 and also won the Members Player of the Year. He was nominated for the Golden Boot for his efforts throughout the season. He was again named the Tigers Player of the Year in 2010 and 2011.

Footnotes

External links
Profile at hullfc.com
(archived by web.archive.org) Hull F.C. profile
(archived by web.archive.org) Profile at leedsrugby
(archived by web.archive.org) England profile
(archived by web.archive.org) Gareth Ellis at Wests Tigers
(archived by web.archive.org) Super League profile at rugby-league.com

1981 births
Living people
England national rugby league team players
English rugby league players
Great Britain national rugby league team players
Hull F.C. captains
Hull F.C. players
Leeds Rhinos players
People educated at Selby High School
Rugby league centres
Rugby league locks
Rugby league players from Leeds
Rugby league second-rows
Wakefield Trinity players
Wests Tigers players
Yorkshire rugby league team players